Philip Babcock Gove (June 27, 1902–November 16, 1972) was an American lexicographer who was editor-in-chief of the Webster's Third New International Dictionary, published in 1961.

Born in Concord, New Hampshire, he received his A.B. from Dartmouth College, his A.M. from Harvard University, his Ph.D. from Columbia University, and his D.Litt. from Dartmouth.  He started working for the G. and C. Merriam Company in 1946.  Gove was managing editor of Webster's Third from 1950 to 1952, general editor from 1952 to 1960, and editor-in-chief from 1960 until his retirement in 1967.Woolfe, Henry Bosley Philip Babcock Gove: 27 June 1902-16 November 1972, American Speech, Vol. 45, No 3/4, pp. 163-67(

Gove died at his home in Warren, Massachusetts of a heart attack on November 16, 1972, survived by his wife and three children.

References

Herbert C. Morton.  The Story of Webster's Third:  Philip Gove's Controversial Dictionary and Its Critics.  Cambridge and New York:  Cambridge University Press, 1994.
James Sledd and Wilma R. Ebbit, editors.  Dictionaries and That Dictionary.  Chicago:  Scott Foresman, 1962.
David Skinner. "The Story of Ain't: America, Its Language, and the Most Controversial Dictionary Ever".  2012.

External links
 

American lexicographers
1902 births
1972 deaths
Dartmouth College alumni
Harvard University alumni
Columbia University alumni
People from Concord, New Hampshire
Place of death missing
20th-century American non-fiction writers
20th-century lexicographers
Linguists from the United States